The blue-lined octopus (Hapalochlaena fasciata) is one of four species of highly venomous blue-ringed octopuses. It can be found in Pacific Ocean waters that stretch from Australia to Japan. It is most commonly found around intertidal rocky shores and coastal waters to a depth of 15 metres (49 ft) between southern Queensland and southern New South Wales. It is relatively small, with a mantle up to 45 millimetres (1.8 in) in length. In its relaxed state, it is a mottled yellow-brown with dark blue or black streaks covering the whole body apart from the underside of its arms, but its vibrant blue markings appear as a warning to predators when it feels threatened. Along with its other closely related species, the blue-lined octopus is regarded as one of the most dangerous animals in the sea, and its venom can be fatal to humans.

Behavior 
Blue-lined octopuses tend to swim around shallow areas of coral reefs and tide pools. They often hide in crevices of reefs, empty seashells, and other ocean resources they can find to conceal their identity. They are diurnal creatures, hunting crabs and small fish during the day. They do not use their venom (known as tetrodotoxin) to kill their prey, but instead trap it inside their arms and pierce them with its parrot-like beak.

Lethality
Blue-lined octopuses can be very lethal to humans. Their saliva contain a special neurotoxin called tetrodotoxin. However, the species is more likely to flee and find shelter in an encounter due to their extremely shy nature. Nonetheless, there have been at least three reported human deaths from the blue-lined octopus. It poses most danger to those who pick up the octopus and physically touch it.

If a human is to be attacked by the octopus, the injection may not be felt at first due to the small injection apparatus of the octopus. After some time, symptoms of the injection include loss of feeling in the tongue/lips, muscle weakness/paralyzation, respiratory failure, unconsciousness, and eventually death. The tetrodotoxin in blue-lined octopuses is so lethal that it has been estimated that the venom from a single 25-gram octopus can kill about ten 75-kilogram humans.

Reproduction
The blue-lined octopuses start reproducing at a year old. Males seek out female companions and then pounce on them. If they are successful, the female octopus will lay 50 to 100 eggs 30 days after the encounter. During the 30 days, the female octopus hides her eggs under her arms and does not leave her hiding spot until the eggs hatch. After laying her eggs, the female octopus dies.

References 

Octopuses